BemSimples ("Quite Simple" in English) was a Brazilian television channel owned and operated by Fox International Channels and by Fox International Channels Portugal in Portugal. The channel has programming geared primarily to entertainment, female, with programs dedicated to cuisine, fashion, babies, among other things, the program schedule consists mainly of programs 30 minutes on average.

Formerly, BemSimples was a timeshare channel distributed on Fox Life from 8 a.m. to 7 p.m between 2010 and March 1, 2011, when it gained its own channel.

The channel is a franchise channel of the Argentine Utilisima, launched in 2008, 60% of its programming is national, and 40% are dubbing the channel of the Argentine Confluence is the 12th channel of the Fox.

All programs are issuing the documents produced in Argentina.

In 2014, the carriage of Bem Simples was merged with Fox Life, and the network was discontinued fully at the end of May 2014.

Programming
The following is a list of programs broadcast by BemSimples.

Challenge the Chef
Chefs on the Edge
The Guide
The Confectionery
Home Express
Brazil in Prato
Show Baby
Emotional Health
Womanhood
Everything Simple
Men Gourmet
Make it Home
Homemade Kitchen
Point and Line
Super Express
Easy Party
Cooking School
Decorate at Home
Crafts Gallery
Sweet Child Workshop
Contact Physician
Energy Feng Shui
The Magical World of Leticia
Yoga
Aesthetic Center
 Palmirinha's Program

References

External links
Official website
Official website 

The Walt Disney Company subsidiaries
Fox Networks Group
Television channels and stations established in 2011
Television channels and stations disestablished in 2014
2011 establishments in Brazil
2014 disestablishments in Brazil
Defunct television channels in Brazil